Circles in a Forest is a 1989 South African drama film directed by Regardt van den Bergh and starring Ian Bannen, Brion James and Joe Stewardson. The film score was composed by Leonard Rosenman.

The film is adapted from the novel by Dalene Matthee.

Plot

Saul Barnard befriends an elephant as a child, and later goes back to rescue it as a man.

Cast
 Ian Bannen as MacDonald
 Brion James as Mr. Patterson
 Dorette Potgieter as Jane
 Joe Stewardson as Joram Barnard
 Judi Trott as Kate MacDonald
 Arnold Vosloo as Saul Barnard

References

External links
 

1989 films
1989 crime drama films
Afrikaans-language films
Films scored by Leonard Rosenman
Films about elephants
Films directed by Regardt van den Bergh
South African drama films